Pheia nanata is a moth in the subfamily Arctiinae. It was described by William James Kaye in 1919. According to Kaye, it has a black head and shoulders with metallic green spots. The first segment of its abdomen has sublateral red spots, and faint green dorsal spots. It is found in Peru.

References

Moths described in 1919
nanata